Church of San Nicolás may refer to:

Church of San Nicolás (Guadalajara)
Church of San Nicolás (Madrid)
Church of San Nicolás (Portomarín)
Church of San Nicolás (Soria)
Church of San Nicolás (Valencia)